Suzhou SND Tram is a tram system in Suzhou New District, Suzhou, Jiangsu, China. The tram uses an overhead catenery system. Suzhou Tram started construction on September 11, 2012 and was opened on October 26, 2014. There is currently two lines in operation in the Suzhou New District. The Suzhou High-Tech Rail Tram Limited was established in April 2011, and the tram line was approved by the Suzhou City government June the same year.

Operations

Tram routes
 Line 1 – Shizishan to Xiyangshan
 Line 2 main route – Longkang Lu to Suzhou Xinqu Railway Station
 Line 2 branch route – Longkang Lu to Wenchang Lu

Network info

 Total length – 
 Opened – October 26, 2014
 Number of stops – 22
 Number of routes – 1 (two more routes are under construction)
 Gauge –

Depots & termini
The tram depot is at Yangshan (for tram Line 1) and Tong'an (for tram Line 2). Termini are Shizishan and Longkang Lu.

Alignment and interchanges

The tram routes runs on reserved grassed track at middle of the road.

There is an interchange with Suzhou Metro Line 1 and Line 3 – at Shizishan.

Rolling stock

All trams are low floor, fully air conditioned, can run high speed. Each tram has five cars. It takes electricity via pantograph.

Stations

Line 1

Line 2

See also
 Suzhou Metro

References

External links
Official website of Suzhou tram

Suzhou
Transport in Suzhou